Tina Piermarini is an entrepreneur and Fortune 100 executive.  She designed and implemented marketing and business development strategies for global companies. Piermarini studies how information technology can continue to support business growth in the industry. Her perspectives on applying innovation to achieve new levels of business transformation have been published in World Energy, Energy Business and Technology, and on eds.com.

Professional career 
On July 28, 2014, Ciber Inc., a global information technology consulting, services and outsourcing company, announced that Tina Piermarini had joined the executive leadership team as Executive Vice President and Chief Administrative Officer. She is responsible for global shared service functions including Human Resources, Marketing and IT.

Piermarini most recently founded her own firms "Thinking is Required" (2011) and "Vivezza" (2008) in Dallas, TX.  Thinking is Required, has worked with entrepreneurs, new business start-ups, and global organizations.  The company’s focus is idea generation, developing strategies and implementing techniques in the Retail, Public Relations, Entertainment, Logistics, Customer Service, Print, Consumer Goods and Scientific Industries.

Prior to forming Thinking is Required and Vivezza, Piermarini was Senior Vice President and Chief Administrative Officer (CAO) of Electronic Data Systems (EDS), started in 1962 by H. Ross Perot a $22 billion IT services giant acquired by Hewlett-Packard. She also served as a company officer and member of EDS' Executive Committee, reporting directly to the Chairman and CEO.  Starting in 2007, she served as Chairman of the Board of Directors at ExcellerateHRO, the jointly owned HR outsourcing business of EDS and Towers Perrin.

During her tenure at EDS, Piermarini was a member of the executive team that engineered one of the most comprehensive financial, operational and cultural business transformations of the past decade. She played an instrumental role in restructuring and revitalizing the company during its global business transformation. In 2003, Piermarini was tasked with redesigning the company’s internal processes, while supporting the company’s larger business plan and unifying its workforce, a task she likened “to keep(ing) the airplane in the air while you’re changing the wing.” The program was implemented to free up EDS to shift its creative energies away from its "transformation" and toward its future. Piermarini’s organization infused new talent throughout the company and implemented recruitment, training, compensation, benefits, diversity and career development programs that could enhance EDS' competitiveness and performance. “Within 45 days of the original transformation in July and August 2003, the company reassigned its entire workforce of 130,000 employees.”  Additionally, she designed and implemented a global executive talent management program, personally coaching more than 200 of the company's senior executives. Piermarini also led the development of EDS' succession plans, ensuring the company had a robust pipeline of strong talent within its executive ranks.

Piermarini directed the company's global Human Resources, Enterprise Risk Management, Security, Real Estate, Travel, and Administration. From 2001-2002, Piermarini was president of EDS' Global Energy Industry Group, bringing 20 years of energy leadership experience to help grow the unit into the $1 billion sector.  She also served as EDS' Executive Sponsor of Susan G. Komen for the Cure and its worldwide races.

Before joining EDS, Piermarini served as Vice President of Strategic Marketing, Sales, and Business Development for Halliburton affiliate GrandBasin as well as Vice President of Marketing and Innovation, Energy for Science Applications International Corporation. (SAIC) Additionally, she spent 19 years at Data General Corporation holding Global Account Management and Sales Leadership positions, transforming and growing multinational companies with strategic marketing and technology implementation; Piermarini was the Multinational Multinational Account Vice President at the time of the company's sale.

Education 
Piermarini is a magna cum laude graduate (1974) of Springfield College in Massachusetts and participated in the Executive Development Program at Rice University in 1994.

Speeches & Appearances 
Piermarini delivered a bold, intimate and well-argued speech at the Franklin Covey Symposium for ‘Sustained Superior Performance' in Chicago on May 4, 2005, where she discussed the “essential balance between work and life that must exist for individuals, families and companies to flourish and realize their full potential.”

Also in 2005, Piermarini helped EDS CEO, Michael H. Jordan author the Corporate Social Responsibility Report titled "Creating a World of Opportunity."

In April 2006, Piermarini spoke at the Annual Conference for the Human Resource Planning Society alongside Mike Jordan, Chairman and CEO of EDS.  Piermarini spoke about the importance of knowing and harnessing company culture or “DNA”.

Piermarini was asked to be a speaker for SMU’s  Business Leaders Spotlight in August 2007. At the Business Leaders Spotlight, sponsored by Bank of Texas, leaders from some of the top organizations throughout the nation speak to members of the Cox, SMU and DFW business communities. Recent speakers have included Dallas Mayor Tom Leppert, William Blase with AT&T, and George Abercrombie with Hoffmann-La Roche

In November 2007, Piermarini also appeared at a forum for the Houston Wellness Association in a speech titled “Creating a Culture of Wellness”.

Piermarini sat on the advisory board of BrainHealth Strategies, which is affiliated with the Center for BrainHealth at The University of Texas at Dallas from 2010-2012.

References

American businesspeople
Living people
Year of birth missing (living people)